Centranthera nepalensis, the Nepal spur-anther flower is a hemiparasitic plant in the family Orobanchaceae. It is endemic to South India.

Description 
It is an erect densely hispid herbaceous plant growing up to 1–2 ft tall, with purplish red or nearly white funnel shaped flowers. Leaves are opposite or rarely alternate, sub-sessile and linear-lance shaped. Flowering season is  September to December.

References 

Orobanchaceae